Paul Edward Funk II (born 1962) is a retired four-star general in the United States Army who last served as the commanding officer of the Army Training and Doctrine Command. He previously served as the 60th Commanding General of III Corps and Fort Hood, Texas, and as the Commanding General, Combined Joint Task Force – Operation Inherent Resolve. Funk was born at Fort Hood, Texas, graduated from Fort Knox High School, and was commissioned an Armor Officer through ROTC upon graduation from Montana State University in 1984. His first assignments saw him serve in a variety of Armor and Cavalry roles to include Tank Platoon Leader, Company Executive Officer, Squadron Commander of 1st Squadron, 7th Cavalry Regiment and Brigade Commander of 1st Brigade Combat Team, 1st Cavalry Division located at Fort Hood.

Personal life and education
Funk is the son of Lieutenant General Paul E. Funk I and is married to the former Elizabeth Yeosock, daughter of Lieutenant General John J. Yeosock. They have three children and one grandson.

Funk holds a bachelor's degree in speech communications from Montana State University and a Master of Science in Administration from Central Michigan University. He is also a graduate of the Armor Basic Officer Leaders and Advanced Courses, and the Command and General Staff College at Fort Leavenworth. He completed his Senior Service College as a fellow at the Institute of Advanced Technology, University of Texas at Austin.

Assignments
 A Company, 2nd Battalion, 32nd Armor Regiment, 1st Brigade, 3rd Armored Division in Kirchgöns, Germany
 Headquarters and Headquarters Company, 4th Battalion, 67th Armor Regiment, 3rd Brigade, 3rd Armored Division in Friedberg, Germany
 1st Squadron, 7th Cavalry Regiment (GARRYOWEN), 4th Brigade, 1st Cavalry Division at Fort Hood, Texas
 1st Brigade Combat Team (IRONHORSE), 1st Cavalry Division at Fort Hood, Texas
 1st Infantry Division (Big Red One) at Fort Riley, Kansas

Joint assignments
 Chief, Joint Exercise Section J-37, North American Aerospace Defense Command (NORAD), U.S. Space Command at Peterson Air Force Base, Colorado
 Deputy Commanding General (Maneuver), Combined Joint Task Force-1 in Afghanistan
 Commander, Combined Joint Forces Land Component Command-Iraq in Baghdad, Iraq

Operational assignments

 Observer Controller with the Live Fire Team (Dragons) at the National Training Center, Fort Irwin, California
 Squadron Operations Officer of 1st Squadron, 3rd Armored Cavalry Regiment at Fort Carson, Colorado
 Regimental Operations Officer, 3rd Armored Cavalry Regiment at Fort Carson, Colorado
 Division Operations Officer, 1st Cavalry Division at Fort Hood, Texas
 Chief of Staff, III Corps at Fort Hood, Texas
 Deputy Commanding General at the Combined Arms Center for Training at Fort Leavenworth, Kansas
 Deputy Commanding General (Maneuver), 1st Infantry Division at Fort Riley, Kansas
 Assistant Deputy Chief of Staff, G-3/5/7, U.S. Army in Washington, D.C.

Funk has deployed five times and has led soldiers in combat during Operations Desert Shield and Desert Storm, twice in Operation Iraqi Freedom, in Operation Enduring Freedom, and in Operation Inherent Resolve. Funk was Commanding General, Combined Joint Task Force – Operation Inherent Resolve from 2017 to 2018.

Awards and decorations

Education
Funk holds a Bachelor of Arts in Speech Communications from Montana State University and a Master of Science in Administration from Central Michigan University. He is a graduate of the Armor Officer Basic and Advanced Courses, the Command and General Staff College, and completed his Senior Service College as a fellow attending the Institute of Advanced Technology at the University of Texas at Austin. He is a member of the Sigma Chi Fraternity.

References

External links

 TRADOC Biography
 

|-

|-

|-

1962 births
Living people
Military personnel from Montana
Military personnel from Texas
Montana State University alumni
Central Michigan University alumni
United States Army personnel of the Gulf War
United States Army personnel of the Iraq War
United States Army personnel of the War in Afghanistan (2001–2021)
Recipients of the Defense Distinguished Service Medal
Recipients of the Distinguished Service Medal (US Army)
Recipients of the Defense Superior Service Medal
Recipients of the Legion of Merit
United States Army generals